Daniel Bradford Cox (born 21 September 1959) is an English born American former professional baseball pitcher, who played in Major League Baseball (MLB) for the St. Louis Cardinals (1983–1988), the Philadelphia Phillies (1991–1992), the Pittsburgh Pirates (1992), and the Toronto Blue Jays (1993–1995), after which he retired from active play.

Danny Cox was born in Northampton, Northamptonshire, where his father was stationed while serving in the United States Air Force. When he was two, Cox and his family moved back to the United States. They settled in Warner Robins, Georgia, where he attended Warner Robins High School. After high school, He attended Chattahoochee Valley Community College in Phenix City, Alabama before receiving a scholarship to Troy University in Troy, Alabama. Cox was selected in the 13th round of the 1981 Major League Baseball Draft by the Cardinals. Over Cox’ eleven-year big league career, he won 74, lost 75, recorded a 3.64 earned run average (ERA), 21 complete games, five shutouts, and eight saves. Cox won Game 3 of the 1985 National League Championship Series with the Cardinals trailing 2 games to none. He pitched well in the 1985 World Series, but earned two no-decisions. Cox pitched a shutout in Game 7 of the 1987 National League Championship Series, and was the winning pitcher in Game 5 of the 1987 World Series. After being removed in Game 7, he argued with umpire Dave Phillips; Cox was then ejected, as he left the field.

Cox was inducted into the St. Louis Sports Hall of Fame on May 2, 2022.

Coaching career
Cox managed the Gateway Grizzlies, a Frontier League team based in Sauget, Illinois, from 2003 to 2006, compiling a record of 197–175 and one league championship. In 2008, he coached the New Athens, Illinois, High School baseball team, however he resigned mid-season. Cox currently frequents clinics in the St. Louis area, and offers pitching lessons to young players near his Freeburg, Illinois, home.

In February 2009, Cox was named pitching coach for the Springfield Sliders of the Prospect League.

On 17 December 2009, the Lancaster Barnstormers of the Atlantic League of Professional Baseball named Cox pitching coach for the 2010 season.

References

External links

1959 births
Living people
Major League Baseball players from the United Kingdom
Major League Baseball players from England
English baseball players
Sportspeople from Northampton
English emigrants to the United States
St. Louis Cardinals players
Philadelphia Phillies players
Pittsburgh Pirates players
Toronto Blue Jays players
Major League Baseball pitchers
Troy Trojans baseball players
People from St. Clair County, Illinois
Johnson City Cardinals players
Springfield Cardinals players
Louisville Redbirds players
Arkansas Travelers players
St. Petersburg Cardinals players
Scranton/Wilkes-Barre Red Barons players
Clearwater Phillies players
Buffalo Bisons (minor league) players
Dunedin Blue Jays players
Syracuse Chiefs players